Lamkang Naga may refer to:
 Lamkang Naga people (Lamkang Nagas) - Lamkang people
 Lamkang Naga language - Lamkang language